French Polynesia requires its residents to register their motor vehicles and display vehicle registration plates. Current plates are European standard 520 mm × 110 mm, and use French stamping dies. The overseas departments and territories of France have three-digit codes, starting with 97, which was originally the single code for them all.

References

Weblinks 
License plates of French Polynesia at Francoplaque 

French Polynesia
Transport in French Polynesia
French Polynesia-related lists